Brunnen is a resort on Lake Lucerne in Switzerland, part of the municipality Ingenbohl (Canton of Schwyz), at .

Brunnen railway station, on the Gotthard railway, is served by hourly InterRegio trains, and by lines S2 of the Stadtbahn Zug, which operates hourly between Zug, Arth-Goldau and Erstfeld, and S3 of the S-Bahn Luzern, which operates hourly to Lucerne.

Brunnen also has a cablecar that goes to the Urmiberg, a part of the Rigi offering views of Lake Lucerne and the Alps.

History 
Winston Churchill spent his honeymoon in Brunnen. J.M.W. Turner painted several views from Brunnen, among his late watercolours, in the 1840s.

In 1947, the Swiss League for the Protection of Nature organised an international conference on the protection of nature in Brunnen. It resulted in the creation of the International Union for Conservation of Nature in 1948.

People
Ugo Rondinone, a Swiss artist, was born in Brunnen
Maria Theresia Scherer, nun of the convent Ingenbohl died in Brunnen
Othmar Schoeck, a Swiss composer was born in Brunnen

References

External links
www.brunnen.ch - Portal of the municipality of Ingenbohl-Brunnen

Brunnen Tourist Office

Villages in the canton of Schwyz
Populated places on Lake Lucerne